Derbyshire Country Cricket Club in 1877 was the cricket season when the English club Derbyshire played their seventh season.

Yorkshire  joined Hampshire, Lancashire and Kent  as the fourth county to play Derbyshire. John Platts became the first cricketer to score a century for Derbyshire.

1877 season

All Derbyshire's matches were first class in the 1877 season. They played eight county games, two each against Yorkshire, Lancashire, Kent and Hampshire, and one match against MCC. They won five matches, beating Kent and Hampshire in both matches and Lancashire in one. They lost three matches – one each to Yorkshire, Lancashire and MCC – and drew their other match against Yorkshire

The captain for the year was Robert Smith. Of the players who made their debuts, Leonard Jackson a publican, and Arthur Forman, a Repton schoolmaster both continued playing regularly for five years while Thomas Mycroft appeared occasionally as wicket keeper over the next ten years. Charles Regan a brewer's traveller played his five career first class matches during the season.

Rev William Humble who had played occasionally since 1873 put in his last appearance for the club. Amos Hind who failed to live up to the promise of his initial 1876 season, also left the side.

In their opening match against Lancashire, Derbyshire opened with 111 to which Lancashire replied with 84. Although Derbyshire only managed 51 in their second innings, Lancashire fared worse with 44 to give Derbyshire a 34 run victory. Against Hampshire, Derbyshire made 115 in the first innings and Hampshire scored 105 in response. Derbyshire's second innings reached 242, although no player scored 50 or more. Hampshire were only able to make 63 in reply giving Derbyshire a 189 run victory. Against MCC,  Derbyshire were playing a side which included W G Grace who made 83 runs and took 14 wickets. In the first innings MCC made 112, being checked by Mycroft who took 8 wickets while Derbyshire replied with 117.  In the second innings MCC made 123 while Derbyshire made 78 to lose by 40 runs. In their second match against Lancashire, Lancashire set an opening target of 215 and Derbyshire made 110 in reply and 114 in the follow-on. Lancashire made the necessary 10 runs to win by 10 wickets. Against Kent, Kent made 191 in the first innings due to 80 by Lord Harris and Derbyshire replied with 127. In Kent's second innings Harris was out for a duck and Kent made 124, while Derbyshire's reply of 189 thanks to 54 not out by Foster gave them the match by one wicket. George Gibbons Hearne   took 14 wickets for Kent in the match. In Derbyshire's first County match against Yorkshire, Yorkshire scored 210 and Derbyshire who made 108 were forced to follow on. Derbyshire's second innings total of 189 left Yorkshire with 88 to make which they achieved with the loss of one wicket. In the second Kent match, Kent made 149 in the first innings and Derbyshire replied with 110. Kent's second innings score was 78 and Derbyshire reached 119 to win with three wickets to spare. In the second Hampshire match Hampshire opened with 120 and Derbyshire ran up 319 in reply. Although both R Smith and Rigley were injured in the innings this was compensated for by a score of 115 by Platt. Hampshire scored 86 in their second innings to give Derbyshire a victory by an innings and 113 runs. In the final match against Yorkshire, Yorkshire began with 278 and with a first innings reply of 74, Derbyshire had to follow-on needing over 200. However Derbyshire made 220 with 90 not out by Platt to save the match as a draw, and as there was insufficient time for Yorkshire to bat.

John Platts was top scorer and W Mycroft took most wickets with 63. Platts was also the first Derbyshire cricketer to score a century for the club.

Matches

{| class="wikitable" width="100%"
! bgcolor="#efefef" colspan=6 | List of  matches
|- bgcolor="#efefef"
!No.
!Date
!V
!Result 
!Margin
!Notes
|-
|1
|21 May 1877
|  Lancashire  County Ground, Derby 
|bgcolor="#00FF00"|Won 
| 34 runs
| W McIntyre  8–31 and 7–16; W Hickton 5–37; J T B D Platts 5–18
|- 
|2
|24 May 1877
|HampshireDay's (Antelope) Ground, Southampton 
|bgcolor="#00FF00"|Won 
| 189 runs
| A Ridley 7–46; W Mycroft  6–31 and 6–16; F Tate  6–76
|- 
|3
|28 May 1877
|MCCLord's Cricket Ground, St John's Wood 
|bgcolor="#FF0000"|Lost 
| 40 runs
| W Mycroft 8–47 and 5–57; W G Grace 6–55 and 8–54
|- 
|4
|31 May 1877
|  Lancashire  At Old Trafford, Manchester 
|bgcolor="#FF0000"|Lost 
| 10 wickets
| W McIntyre  5–39 and 7–52;  A Watson  5–66
|- 
|5 
|18 Jun 1877
| Kent County Ground, Derby 
|bgcolor="#00FF00"|Won 
| 1 wicket
| W Mycroft 7–82 and 5–48;  GG Hearne  6–52 and 8–78
|- 
|6
|09 Jul 1877
| Yorkshire  Bramall Lane, Sheffield  
|bgcolor="#FF0000"|Lost 
| 9 wickets
| W Mycroft  5–73; T Emmett 5–25
|- 
|7
|16 Jul 1877
|| Kent  Higher Common Ground, Tunbridge Wells 
|bgcolor="#00FF00"|Won 
| 3 wickets
| W Hickton 6–47; W Mycroft  6–31 
|- 
|8
| 23 Jul 1877
|HampshireCounty Ground, Derby 
|bgcolor="#00FF00"|Won 
| Innings and 113 runs
| J T B D Platts 115;A Ridley 5–121;  W Hickton 5–44
|- 
|9
|20 Aug 1877
|YorkshireCounty Ground, Derby
|bgcolor="#FFCC00"|Drawn
|
| RO Clayton 7–35
|-

Statistics

Cricketers who played and their first-class batting performances

Platts also played 2 innings and scored 46 runs  for Players of the North. W Mycroft played 23 innings in 14 other first class matches for a variety of sides scoring 92 runs.

First-class bowling averages

Mycroft took an additional 94 first class wickets for other teams

Wicket Keeping
Alfort Smith Catches 5, Stumping 0
Thomas Mycroft Catches 1, Stumping 1

See also
Derbyshire County Cricket Club seasons
1877 English cricket season

References

1877 in English cricket
Derbyshire County Cricket Club seasons
English cricket seasons in the 19th century